Dmitry Kharitonchik (born 11 June 1986) is a Belarusian former professional footballer.

Honours
FBK Kaunas
A Lyga champion: 2006

References

External links

Profile at teams.by

1986 births
Living people
Belarusian footballers
Association football midfielders
Belarusian expatriate footballers
Expatriate footballers in Lithuania
FC Slavia Mozyr players
FC Partizan Minsk players
FBK Kaunas footballers
FC Belshina Bobruisk players
FC Gorodeya players
FC Khimik Svetlogorsk players